Shazitang station is a subway station in Changsha, Hunan, China, operated by the Changsha subway operator Changsha Metro.

Station layout
The station has one island platform.

History
Construction began in March 2016 and the station was completed in October 2017. The station opened on 26 May 2019.

Surrounding area
 First Affiliated Hospital of Hunan University of Traditional Chinese Medicine
 Changsha Opera and Dance Theatre
 Changsha Daotian Middle School
 Shazitang School

References

Railway stations in Hunan
Railway stations in China opened in 2019